Snowpiercer (French: Le Transperceneige) is a post-apocalyptic, climate fiction  graphic novel first published in French by Casterman and created by Jacques Lob and Jean-Marc Rochette. The graphic novel was first published in 1982 under the title Le Transperceneige and later retitled The Escape. The series was continued in two volumes by writer Benjamin Legrand, replacing Jacques Lob, with The Explorers published in 1999 and The Crossing in 2000. A fourth volume, Terminus, was written by Olivier Bocquet and published in 2015, as a conclusion to the series.

An English translation was released in 2014 by Titan Comics, consisting of two volumes: Snowpiercer: The Escape and Snowpiercer: The Explorers (which also contains The Crossing). A third volume, Terminus, was released in 2016, followed by a prequel series in 2019. The graphic novel became internationally popular following its adaptation as a 2013 film and a television series (2020–present).

Plot

The Escape
After an environmental catastrophe induces an ice age, humanity occupies a 1,001-car train called the Snowpiercer. As the story begins, a man named Proloff is quarantined after escaping from the rearmost cars, and is joined by a woman named Adeline Belleau: herself part of a movement to integrate the members of the back railway cars, who live in squalid conditions, into the rest of the train. Trying to rescue Proloff, Belleau is placed under quarantine with him. The two are eventually called to meet Colonel Krimson, passing through several different cars of the train. As they advance, Proloff and Belleau observe fresh fruit, vegetables, and meat, luxuries which they believed extinct.

Krimson explains to Proloff and Belleau that the Snowpiercer has begun to slow down, and asks Proloff and Belleau's assistance in advancing the occupants of the rear of the train, to enable the rear cars' disconnection. Belleau and the members of her group agree, but Proloff learns that Krimson intends to disconnect the rear cars while his friends are aboard them. After warning Belleau's friends, Belleau and Proloff flee to the front of the train, pursued by the military. At the same time a virus, ostensibly spread by Proloff, is infecting others aboard the train, and the healthy advance to the front.

Before reaching the engine of the Snowpiercer, Proloff breaks all the windows in the final car for unknown reasons. Belleau dies of the cold while Proloff is rescued by Alec Forrester, the engineer behind the Snowpiercer, who appoints him caretaker of 'Olga', the engine. As they are talking, the rear cars are disconnected. Proloff replaces Forrester as Olga's guardian, but realizes that the virus has killed everyone else on board and that his own days are numbered as the train cannot run forever.

The Explorers
After losing contact with the Snowpiercer, those aboard a second train, Icebreaker, fear a collision.  Several explorers are sent on a braking exercise, where they stop the train. Only one explorer returns alive, and soon disappears.
Seventeen years later, Puig Vallès joins one of the now semi-regular braking exercises to avoid collision with the Snowpiercer. Puig disobeys orders during the braking exercise, so in retaliation he is falsely accused of murdering one of his fellow explorers.  He is sentenced to fly a small plane on what is deemed a suicidal scouting mission. Puig flies ahead of the train and spots a downed bridge and warns the train, but the council wants him dead and refuse to allow him to return and land his plane.  Puig threatens to crash his plane into the train and derail it, while his lover Val broadcasts footage to everyone aboard the train.  Their efforts force the council to spin the event such that Puig is now hailed as a hero for saving the train.

It is then revealed to Puig that during the first braking exercise, the Icebreaker actually hit Snowpiercer, and its engine was brought aboard.  The sole surviving explorer has since been tending to the engine along with Proloff, who only talks to the engine. The council maintains the myth that the Snowpiercer is out of control and still circling the world, to control the populace with fear.

The Crossing
The train detects a radio signal originating from across the frozen ocean.  Puig decides to follow the radio music to its source, and it is revealed that the train can travel off the tracks by mounting caterpillar treads.  Living standards deteriorate aboard the train, culminating in a failed but disastrous revolt where many people are killed, and numerous cars and resources are destroyed, making living conditions unsustainable.  The train finally crosses the frozen ocean and reaches the source of the music, but the explorers are devastated to discover there are no people -- only an automated signal.

Terminus
With no more heat or food on the train, the passengers of the Icebreaker rebel and elect Laura Lewis as their new leader. Puig learns that Val is pregnant, and his explorers seek the source of the radio station's power.  They discover the radio station is actually the top floor of a skyscraper and the ground floor is a train station.  They turn on beacons which allow the Icebreaker to crash into the station, providing shelter but trapping and critically damaging the train in the process.  Laura has Puig arrested, as she holds him responsible for the fateful decision to cross the ocean and the train's eventual destruction.

While exploring the station, the passengers are seized by people wearing mice masks.  The passengers are given food, but put in quarantine and inoculated for disease. The passengers are permitted to join the mice community, but are forced to be barcoded and blood-tested, and children and pregnant women are taken away for "special treatment."  Val uses a distraction to barcode herself and avoid a blood test, which would expose her pregnancy.  It is revealed that the compound is a hybrid research laboratory and amusement park named Future Land.  Its deranged founders, the "switchmen", have prolonged their life by using the stem cells of babies, and used the radio signal to lure all the other trains to them:  There were ten perpetual trains, of which Icebreaker was the last of seven that successfully reached the station. It is further revealed that the switchmen have neutered all the mice and perform genetic experiments on fetuses and babies, in a misguided attempt to engineer a perfect human species.  Laura betrays Val, who is taken to the switchmen.

While this was happening, Puig escaped his captivity and recovered with the engineer's aid.  Under disguise as a mouse, Puig uncovers that the nuclear plant which powers the compound is leaking and slowly killing the population.  Puig reunites with Tom (the former radarist), Val and the other explorers, and together they free the children and animals that are held in captivity. They return to the Icebreaker, which the engineer has repaired, but are confronted by armed mice. Puig describes the situation and appeals to them to join him and the other passengers, and many of the mice defect.

The story ends in the future:  Hunters have just killed a killer whale, and as Puig dies of old age, a glimpse of flowers growing out of a patch of thawed earth is shown.

The Prequel
Explores the events leading up to The Escape. Written by Matz (Alexis Nolent) and illustrated by Jean-Marc Rochette

Part 1: Extinction
This volume is set before the mass extinction event that caused the ice age.

Part 2: Apocalypse
This volume is set days after the extinction event.

Part 3: Annihilation
This volume is set a short time after the extinction event and after Part 2.

Adaptations

Film

Korean director Bong Joon-ho adapted the graphic novel to the cinema as Snowpiercer, which was originally released in 2013. It was released the following year in the United States.

TV series

A Snowpiercer television series was developed with Josh Friedman writing and Bong as executive producer. In November 2016, TNT ordered a series pilot episode from Tomorrow Studios. In May 2017 it was reported that Daveed Diggs would star in the series and Scott Derrickson would direct the pilot and executive produce the series.  Derrickson filmed a feature-length pilot episode but refused to do the extreme reshoots requested by the new showrunner who wanted to take the show in a different direction. The series debuted on TNT on May 17, 2020.

References

1982 graphic novels
1982 comics debuts
French graphic novels
Post-apocalyptic comics
Science fiction graphic novels
French comics adapted into films
Works set on trains
French science fiction works
Novels set on trains